The St. Louis Gateway Film Critics Association Award for Best Supporting Actress is one of the annual awards given by the St. Louis Gateway Film Critics Association.

Winners
 † – indicates the performance also won the Academy Award for Best Supporting Actress
 ‡ – indicates the performance was also nominated for the Academy Award for Best Supporting Actress

2000s

2010s

2020s

Actress, Supporting
St. Louis Gateway Film Critics Association Awards